is a downtown covered shopping arcade that serves as the main shopping area in the city of Gifu in Gifu Prefecture, Japan.

History
Yanagase first shot to nationwide fame when Kenichi Mikawa released Yanagase Blues in 1966. Many visitors from throughout Japan came to Gifu to shop here as a result of the song. Gifu's position as a center of the fashion industry also helped make Yanagase a popular shopping area.

Location
Yanagase is located approximately 700m north of JR Gifu Station on the city's main street (Nagarabashi-dōri), which also forms its eastern border. It covers an area approximately 500m wide and is bordered on the west by Chūsetsubashi-dōri. Kinkabashi-dōri runs through the center of Yanagase, effectively dividing it into eastern and western portions.

Major Facilities
Gifu Takashimaya: This is Yanagase's number one department store. Sales reached a peak of 24.9 billion yen (approximately $184 million) in 1991, but had dropped to 15.6 billion yen (approximately $116 million) by February 2005, at which point Takashimaya began renovating the store to support sagging sales. The resulting renewal has again increased sales at Takashimaya. In December 2006, Takashimaya opened a branch of MUJI in a neighboring building.

MELSA: Part of the Meitetsu chain, MELSA is primarily devoted to women's fashion and gourmet foods. MELSA Hall, a concert hall, is located on the eighth floor. Daiso, a popular 100-yen shop, is located on the fifth floor.

See also
 List of shopping malls in Japan

References

Buildings and structures in Gifu
Tourist attractions in Gifu Prefecture
Shopping centres in Japan